Donald McIntyre FRSE MBE MID (1891-1954) was a 20th century Scottish gynecologist and medical author.

Early life

McIntyre was born in Greenock on 29 July 1891 the son of Donald McIntyre.

He studied Medicine at Glasgow University graduating MB ChB in 1914. At the outbreak of the First World War he joined the Royal Army Medical Corps and served for the duration of the war, based mainly in the Dardanelles and East Africa. He was Mentioned in Dispatches and was granted a military MBE after the war, also being retired on the rank of honorary Major.

Career 
After the war he took a Diploma at Dublin University. In 1920 he began working as a Pathologist for the Royal Samaritan Hospital for Women, in Glasgow. He was given his doctorate (MD) in 1926, also being awarded the Bellahouston Gold Medal for his thesis. He stayed at the Royal Samaritan Hospital seven years, rising to be Senior Surgeon. He held multiple medical positions in Glasgow Hospitals and was both a lecturer and examiner at Glasgow University. In 1927 he was elected a Fellow of the Royal Society of Edinburgh. His proposers were Thomas Hastie Bryce, Diarmid Noel Paton, Sir John Graham Kerr, and Ralph Stockman.

Death 
He died on 20 October 1954 in a Glasgow nursing home.

Publications

Operative Obstetrics (1937)
Combined Textbook of Obstetrics and Gynaecology (1950)

References

1891 births
1954 deaths
People from Greenock
Scottish gynaecologists
Alumni of the University of Glasgow
Academics of the University of Glasgow
Fellows of the Royal Society of Edinburgh
20th-century Scottish medical doctors
20th-century Scottish educators